Yinon (lit. "it shall flourish") is a moshav in southern Israel. Located near Kiryat Malakhi, it falls under the jurisdiction of Be'er Tuvia Regional Council.

History
The moshav was founded 1952 by Jewish exodus from Yemen. Its name was taken from a passage in the Bible, Psalm 72:17: God's name "shall flourish as long as the sun".

Yinon was founded on the lands of the depopulated Palestinian village of Al-Masmiyya al-Kabira.

References

Moshavim
Populated places established in 1952
Populated places in Southern District (Israel)
1952 establishments in Israel
Yemeni-Jewish culture in Israel